Hamid Reza Kazemi (born 6 May 1992), is an Iranian footballer who currently plays for Giti Pasand in the Azadegan League as a midfielder.

Club career
He joined Sepahan in the summer of 2011 and won the league in his first season.

Club career statistics

Honours

Club
Sepahan
Iran Pro League (1):
2011–12
Hazfi Cup (1): 
2012–13

References

1992 births
Living people
Sportspeople from Isfahan
Iranian footballers
Sepahan S.C. footballers
Giti Pasand players
Association football midfielders